Monoisotopic mass (Mmi) is one of several types of molecular masses used in mass spectrometry. The theoretical monoisotopic mass of a molecule is computed by taking the sum of the accurate masses (including mass defect) of the most abundant naturally occurring stable  isotope of each atom in the molecule. For small molecules made up of low atomic number elements the monoisotopic mass is observable as an isotopically pure peak in a mass spectrum. This differs from the nominal molecular mass, which is the sum of the mass number of the primary isotope of each atom in the molecule and is an integer. It also is different from the molar mass, which is a type of average mass. For some atoms like carbon, oxygen, hydrogen, nitrogen, and sulfur, the Mmi of these elements is exactly the same as the mass of its natural isotope, which is the lightest one. However, this does not hold true for all atoms. Iron's most common isotope has a mass number of 56, while the stable isotopes of iron vary in mass number from 54 to 58. Monoisotopic mass is typically expressed in  daltons (Da), also called unified atomic mass units (u).

Nominal mass vs monoisotopic mass

Nominal mass 
Nominal mass is a term used in high level mass spectrometric discussions, it can be calculated using the mass number of the most abundant isotope of each atom, without regard for the mass defect. For example, when calculating the nominal mass of a molecule of nitrogen (N2) and ethylene (C2H4) it comes out as.

N2

(2*14)= 28  Da 
        
C2H4

(2*12)+(4*1)= 28 Da

What this means, is when using mass spectrometer with insufficient source of power "low resolution" like a quadrupole mass analyser or a quadrupolar ion trap, these two molecules won't be able to be distinguished after ionization, this will be shown by the cross lapping of the m/z peaks. If a high-resolution instrument like an orbitrap or an ion cyclotron resonance is used, these two molecules can be distinguished.

Monoisotopic mass 
When calculating the monoisotopic masses, using the mass of the primary isotope of the elements including the mass defect:

N2

(2*14.003)= 28.006 Da

C2H4

(2*12.000)+(4*1.008)= 28.032 Da

where it will be clear that two different molecules are going through the mass spectrometer. Note that the masses used are neither the integer mass numbers nor the terrestrially averaged standard atomic weights as found in a periodic table.

The monoisotopic mass is very useful when analyzing small organic compounds since compounds with similar weights will not be differentiated if the nominal mass is used. For example,  when comparing tyrosine which has a molecular structure of C9H11NO3 with a monoisotopic mass of 182.081 Da and methionine sulphone C5H11NO4S which clearly are 2 different compounds but methionine sulphone has a 182.048 Da.

Isotopic abundance
If a piece  of iron was put into a mass spectrometer to be analyzed, the mass spectra of iron (Fe) would result in multiple mass spectral peaks due to the existence of the iron isotopes, . The mass spectrum of Fe represents that the monoisotopic mass is not always the most abundant isotopic peak in a spectrum despite it containing the most abundant isotope for each atom. This is because as the number of atoms in a molecule increases, the probability that the molecule contains at least one heavy isotope atom also increases. If there are 100 carbon atoms  in a molecule, and  each carbon has a probability of  approximately 1%  of being a heavy isotope , the whole molecule is highly likely to contain at least one heavy isotope atom of carbon-13 and the most abundant isotopic composition will no longer be the same as the monoisotopic peak.

The monoisotopic peak is sometimes not observable for two primary reasons. First, the monoisotopic peak may not be resolved from the other isotopic peaks. In this case, only the average molecular mass may be observed. In some cases, even when the isotopic peaks are resolved, such as with a high-resolution mass spectrometer, the monoisotopic peak may be below the noise level and higher isotopes may dominate completely.

Monoisotopic mass in spectrometry  
The monoisotopic mass is not used frequently in fields outside of mass spectrometry because other fields cannot distinguish molecules of different isotopic composition. For this reason, mostly the average molecular mass or even more commonly the molar mass is used. For most purposes such as weighing out bulk chemicals only the molar mass is relevant since what one is weighing is a statistical distribution of varying isotopic compositions.

This concept is most helpful in mass spectrometry because individual molecules (or atoms, as in ICP-MS) are measured, and not their statistical average as a whole. Since mass spectrometry is often used for quantifying trace-level compounds, maximizing the sensitivity of the analysis is usually desired. By choosing to look for the most abundant isotopic version of a molecule, the analysis is likely to be most sensitive, which enables even smaller amounts of the target compounds to be quantified. Therefore, the concept is very useful to analysts looking for trace-level residues of organic molecules, such as pesticide residue in foods and agricultural products.

Isotopic masses can play an important role in physics but physics less often deals with molecules. Molecules differing by an isotope are sometimes distinguished from one another in molecular spectroscopy or related fields; however, it is usually a single isotope change on a larger molecule that can be observed rather than the isotopic composition of an entire molecule. The isotopic substitution changes the vibrational frequencies of various bonds in the molecule, which can have observable effects on the chemical reactivity via the kinetic isotope effect, and even by extension the biological activity in some cases.

See also
Mass (mass spectrometry)
Molecular mass
Dalton (unit)
Mass number

References

Mass spectrometry
Chemical properties